The 2000 NCAA Division I Field Hockey Championship was the twentieth women's collegiate field hockey tournament organized by the National Collegiate Athletic Association, to determine the top college field hockey team in the United States. The Old Dominion Lady Monarchs won their record ninth championship, defeating the North Carolina Tar Heels, a fellow perennial power, in the final. The semifinals and championship were hosted by Old Dominion University at Foreman Field in Norfolk, Virginia. As of 2013, despite their earlier dominance, Old Dominion has not won a championship or made an appearance in the title game since 2000.

Bracket

References 

2000
Field Hockey
2000 in women's field hockey
2000 in sports in Virginia
Women's sports in Virginia